Anastasiia Smirnova may refer to:

 Anastasia Smirnova (freestyle skier) (Анастасия Андреевна Смирнова; born 2002), Russian freestyle skier
 Anastasiia Smirnova (figure skater) (Анастасія Смірнова; born 2004), Ukrainian-American pair skater